Robert Craigie, Lord Craigie (1688–1760) was a Scottish politician and judge. He was baptised on 4 March 1688 and died on 10 March 1760.

On 2 April 1742 he was elected member of parliament for the Tain Burghs constituency in northern Scotland. He continued to represent this seat until the general election of 1747, when he did not seek re-election.
 
Admitted as an advocate in 1710, he was appointed Lord Advocate in 1742 and Lord President of the Court of Session in 1754. He took the judicial title of Lord Craigie and lived in Glendoick House to the east of Perth.

Family

His great nephew was Robert Craigie, Lord Craigie.

References

1685 births
1760 deaths
Lord Advocates
Members of the Parliament of Great Britain for Scottish constituencies
Glendoick
British MPs 1741–1747
Members of the Faculty of Advocates
Glendoick
18th-century Scottish judges